Presidential elections were held in the Maldives on 16 October 1998. Maumoon Abdul Gayoom was the sole candidate nominated by Parliament. His candidacy was approved by 90.9% of voters, with a turnout of 76%.

Results

References

Maldives
1998 in the Maldives
Presidential elections in the Maldives
Single-candidate elections
October 1998 events in Asia